The ghost knifefishes are a family, Apteronotidae, of ray-finned fishes in the order Gymnotiformes. These fish are native to Panama and South America. They inhabit a wide range of freshwater habitats, but more than half the species in the family are found deep in rivers (typically deeper than ) where there is little or no light.

The Apteronotidae should not be confused with the unrelated Notopteridae, which are also commonly called knifefishes.

They are distinguished from other gymnotiform fishes by the presence of a caudal fin (all other families lack a caudal fin) as well as a fleshy dorsal organ represented by a longitudinal strip along the dorsal midline. These nocturnal fish have small eyes. Also, sexual dimorphism exists in some genera in snout shape and jaws.

Apteronotids use a high frequency tone-type (also called wave-type) electric organ discharge (EOD) to communicate.

Many Apteronotids are aggressive predators of small aquatic insect larvae and fishes, though there are also piscivorous and planktivorous species. Sternarchella spp. are very unusual, preying on the tails of other electric fishes. Other species, such as Sternarchorhynchus and Sternarchorhamphus, have tubular snouts and forage on the beds of aquatic insect larvae and other small animals which burrow into the river bottom. At least one species (Sternarchogiton nattereri) eats freshwater sponges which grow on submerged trees, stumps, and other woody debris.
The genus Apteronotus is artificial and some of the species do not actually belong in it.

The black ghost knifefish (Apteronotus albifrons) and brown ghost knifefish (Apteronotus leptorhynchus) are readily available as aquarium fish. Others are known to appear in the trade but are quite rare.

Species
FishBase lists 89 species in 15 genera, However, after a number of recent taxonomic advances, Eschmeyer's Catalog of Fishes recognizes 94 species in 16 genera. 

 Genus Adontosternarchus
 Genus Apteronotus
 Genus Compsaraia
 Genus Megadontognathus
 Genus Melanosternarchus
 Genus Orthosternarchus
 Genus Parapteronotus
 Genus Pariosternarchus
 Genus Platyurosternarchus
 Genus Porotergus
 Genus Sternarchella
 Genus Sternarchogiton
 Genus Sternarchorhamphus
 Genus Sternarchorhynchus
 Genus Tembeassu
 Genus Tenebrosternarchus

References

 
Fish of South America
Taxa named by David Starr Jordan